Francis Cordero Capra  (born April 27, 1983) is an American actor. He has played the roles of Max Connor in Kazaam, and Eli "Weevil" Navarro in the TV series Veronica Mars.

Personal life
Capra attended Our Lady of the Assumption Catholic School.  He is not related to the director Frank Capra.

Career
Capra began his acting career in 1993 with A Bronx Tale in which he played the 9-year-old version of the lead character. He played the character of Eli "Weevil" Navarro on the television series Veronica Mars and had a small guest role on The O.C. He appeared on The Closer, Lincoln Heights, Criminal Minds, Friday Night Lights and in the film Crank. Capra starred in Kazaam, A Simple Wish and Free Willy 2: The Adventure Home. He portrayed Jesse Murphy on the television show Heroes.

Capra has a production company called Take Off Productions with actor De'Aundre Bonds.

Awards and nominations
 1994 – Nominated for a Young Artist Award at the Young Artist Awards for Best Youth Actor Co-Starring in a Motion Picture Drama for A Bronx Tale (1993).

Filmography

Film

Television

Music videos

References

External links
 
 

1983 births
Male actors from New York City
American male child actors
American male film actors
American male television actors
Living people
People from the Bronx
American people of Italian descent
American people of Dominican Republic descent
20th-century American male actors
21st-century American male actors